Nicolas Morice (born 1774) was a French navy officer. He was born Lorient.

Career 
Morice became an ensign in 1796 and rose to Lieutenant in 1803. He took part in the Battle of Grand Port, where he captained the corvette Victor.

In 1810 he was promoted to Commander. He took command of the frigate Andromaque, part of a squadron raiding commerce in the Atlantic, along with the Ariane, under Jean-Baptiste-Henri Féretier. Andromaque was destroyed upon her return to Lorient after catching fire during an artillery duel with the 74-gun HMS Northumberland during the action of 22 May 1812. Feretier and Morice were court-martialed for the loss of their ships, stripped of their rank, and forbidden from commanding a ship for three years. They were, however, quickly reintegrated.

Morice was promoted to Captain 1st class in 1827.

Honours 
 Legion of Honour
 Order of Saint Louis in 1814.

Sources and references 

 Sources : AN – BB4 – 353
 

1774 births
19th-century deaths
French Navy officers
French naval commanders of the Napoleonic Wars